is the Reischauer Institute Professor of Japanese Religions at Harvard University. Until May 2004, he was professor of Japanese religions in the departments of religion and East Asian languages and culture at Columbia University.

Abe, through his teaching and books, has made an important contribution to the Western understanding of Buddhism in Japan. His book on Kūkai, The Weaving of Mantra: Kūkai and the Construction of Esoteric Buddhist Discourse, underscores Kūkai's impact on 9th-century Japanese society. At a time when Confucian discourse dominated Japan, Kūkai developed a “voice” for Buddhism. He has also written about Ryōkan and Saichō.

He received his bachelor's degree in economics from Keio University and his master's degree from School of Advanced International Affairs, Johns Hopkins University. He then received his MPhil and PhD in religious studies from Columbia University. In 1991 he began teaching at Columbia, and in 1998 became the Kao Associate Professor of Japanese Religions. He is a recipient of the Philip and Ruth Hettleman Award for distinguished teaching.

Books 
The Weaving of Mantra : Kūkai and the Construction of Esoteric Buddhist Discourse. 1999.
Great Fool: Zen Master Ryokan: Poems, Letters, and Other Writings (with Peter Haskel). 1996. PDF version online, 302p.: . Retrieved 22 August 2020.
Saicho and Kukai: A Conflict of Interpretations. Japanese Journal of Religious Studies. Spring 1995, 22/1–2. PDF. version online, 35p.: . Retrieved 22 August 2020.

References

External links
Harvard University page

1954 births
Living people
Japanese academics
Harvard University faculty
Columbia University faculty
Columbia Graduate School of Arts and Sciences alumni
Keio University alumni
Paul H. Nitze School of Advanced International Studies alumni
Japanese expatriates in the United States